Science Fiction Adventures may refer to one of several science fiction magazines

 Science Fiction Adventures, an American magazine published between 1952 and 1954 as one of John Raymond's science fiction magazines
 Science Fiction Adventures (1956 magazine), an American magazine published between 1956 and 1958
 Science Fiction Adventures (British magazine), a British magazine published between 1958 and 1963, initially as a reprint of the 1956 American magazine